"Gotta Serve Somebody" is a song written and performed by American singer-songwriter Bob Dylan, released as the opening track on his 1979 studio album Slow Train Coming. It won the Grammy Award for Best Rock Vocal Performance by a Male in 1980. It was later anthologized on the compilation albums Biograph (1985), Bob Dylan's Greatest Hits Volume 3 (1994), The Essential Bob Dylan (2000), The Best of Bob Dylan and Dylan (2007).

Background 
The song was recorded in May 1979 at Muscle Shoals Sound Studios in Sheffield, Alabama and produced by Jerry Wexler.  The title never appears as such in the lyrics, though numerous mentions of "You're gonna have to serve somebody" come close.  The B-side, "Trouble in Mind", was a Dylan original that was recorded for Slow Train Coming but was ultimately left off it.

In the final verse, Dylan makes a then-current but now obscure reference ("You may call me RJ, you may call me Ray"), paraphrasing the act of comedian Bill Saluga, who performed as "Raymond J. Johnson Jr."

Reception 
As Dylan's first release during his "gospel" period, "Gotta Serve Somebody" was met with divisive reviews; John Lennon famously criticized the song and wrote a parody titled "Serve Yourself" in response. Nevertheless, the single won the Grammy for Best Rock Vocal Performance by a Male in 1980.  The effort is still Dylan's latest top 40 hit on the Hot 100, peaking at No. 24 and remaining on the chart for 12 weeks. The song did best in Canada, where it spent two weeks at No. 23. 

Cash Box said that the "bluesy instrumentals" were the song's highlight and that "Dylan avoids a preachy tone with humorous asides."  Record World said that "Dylan's fervent vocals, laced with a gospel female chorus, and subdued keyboard/guitar lines make this an important statement."

In 2016, Rolling Stone magazine featured the song as No. 43 on its list of "100 Greatest Bob Dylan Songs". A 2021 Guardian article included it on a list of "80 Bob Dylan songs everyone should know".

Covers 
Shortly after the song's release, Devo, in disguise as a Christian-based cover band, Dove, performed "Gotta Serve Somebody" regularly on the last leg of their Duty Now for the Future tour, featuring Devo mascot Booji Boy on vocals, stating "We used to do devil music like that band Devo, but then Jerry (...) sat on a Bob Dylan record", parodying Dylan's recent conversion.

The song has been covered by over 50 additional artists. Among the most notable versions are those by Shirley Caesar, Willie Nelson, Natalie Cole, Pops Staples, Etta James, Aaron Neville, Mavis Staples, Eric Burdon and Judy Collins.

A 2011 live recording from Levon Helm and Mavis Staples appears on the 2022 album Carry Me Home.

American funk band Vulfpeck covered the song in their 2022 album Schvitz.

Live performances
Dylan has performed the song over 500 times in concert between 1979 and 2021. The live versions he has performed in more recent years feature almost entirely new lyrics, as seen in his "Mondo Scripto" art exhibition in 2018. A live version performed with the Grateful Dead in 1987 was included on the officially released live album Dylan and the Dead. An additional seven versions of the song (five live performances from 1979-1980, a studio outtake and a tour rehearsal) were included on the box set The Bootleg Series Vol. 13: Trouble No More 1979–1981 in 2017.
The song was performed on Saturday Night Live, Oct. 20th 1979. Eric Idle was the host that night.

In popular culture
The song was prominently featured in the Sopranos' episode "House Arrest" in the year 2000, and Mountain's version was used for 2021 Sopranos prequel movie The Many Saints of Newark.

Charts

References

External links
Lyrics at Bob Dylan's official site
Chords at Dylanchords

1979 singles
Songs written by Bob Dylan
Bob Dylan songs
Grateful Dead songs
1979 songs
List songs
Christian rock songs
Funk songs
Song recordings produced by Barry Beckett
Grammy Award for Best Male Rock Vocal Performance
Etta James songs
Song recordings produced by Jerry Wexler
Columbia Records singles
Gospel songs